Dannenhauer & Stauss was founded by Gotthilf Dannenhauer, a German coachbuilder. He had been employed by Karosseriewerk Reutter based in Stuttgart. Whilst there, he was communicating with Volkswagen before World War II. From 1950 to 1957 Reutter manufactured about 100 convertibles, mostly based on the Volkswagen Beetle. The sales price was 8,892 DM. The body was handmade by tapping metal sheets on a template. The doors were made in a pressing shop. Other companies like DKW were supplied.  When in 1955 the Karmann Ghia was mass-produced, the company could no longer compete, and its product was discontinued.  The amount of production was limited, but precise numbers are uncertain. Changing their business model to rebuilding vehicle bodies allowed the company to survive at the address in Augustenstraße, Stuttgart where Reutter had been.

About 15 of the DKW Monza cars were made by Dannenhauer & Stauss.  Ostensibly, a grand total of about 80 of the DKW Monza cars were made, albeit by different companies.

Notes

Further reading

External links 
 
 (German) Information about Dannenhauer & Stauss at the Volkswagen Website, retrieved 8 September 2012
 (German) Classic Car Report, archive.org, retrieved 8 September 2012
 (German) Käfer-Variationen der Fünfziger – Sekt statt Selters, Der Spiegel, 5 Februar 2004

1950 establishments in West Germany
1950s cars
Cars powered by boxer engines
Manufacturing companies based in Stuttgart
Rear-engined vehicles
Rear-wheel-drive vehicles
Subcompact cars
Volkswagen Beetle
German companies established in 1950